Heinrich "Heinz" Baas (13 April 1922 – 6 December 1994) was a German football player and manager.

Baas began his career with Duisburger SV in 1945, and went on to play for Eintracht Frankfurt, Kickers Offenbach and SV Darmstadt 98. As a manager, he was in charge of 1. FSV Mainz 05, KSV Hessen Kassel and Karlsruher SC in the Regionalliga divisions, and also managed SC Freiburg in the 2. Bundesliga Süd.

References

External links 
 

1922 births
1994 deaths
German footballers
Association football midfielders
Eintracht Frankfurt players
Kickers Offenbach players
SV Darmstadt 98 players
German football managers
1. FSV Mainz 05 managers
Karlsruher SC managers
SC Freiburg managers
KSV Hessen Kassel managers
2. Bundesliga managers
SV Sandhausen managers